Jennifer Casson (born August 30, 1995) is a Canadian rower.

Career
At the 2019 World Rowing Championships, Casson along with partner Jill Moffatt finished eighth in the women's lightweight double sculls, finishing one spot out of qualifying the boat for the 2020 Olympics. However, in 2021, New Zealand declined its quota place, allowing the pair to qualify for the games.

In 2019, Casson broke the world indoor rowing record for 2000m - 6:53.8.

In June 2021, Casson was named to Canada's 2020 Olympic team in the women's lightweight double sculls with partner Jill Moffatt.

References

1995 births
Canadian female rowers
Living people
Sportspeople from Kingston, Ontario
Rowers at the 2020 Summer Olympics
21st-century Canadian women